Mitochondrial import receptor subunit TOM70 is a protein that in humans is encoded by the TOMM70A gene.

The translocase of outer mitochondrial membrane (TOM) complex is a multisubunit complex involved in the recognition, unfolding, and translocation of preproteins into the mitochondria. See TIM17A (MIM 605057).[supplied by OMIM]

See also
 Mitochondria Outer Membrane Translocase
 TOMM20
 TOMM22
 TOMM40

References

Further reading

Co-chaperones